Sir Thomas Theophilus Metcalfe, 1st Baronet (8 January 1745 – 17 November 1813) was a British soldier and politician.

Biography
Metcalfe was the son of Rev'd Thomas Metcalfe, a chaplain in the British Army, and his wife, Margaret Williams. 

Metcalfe was born at Throstle Nest, Gisborough, Cleveland, England. He served as an officer in the army of the East India Company having first traveled to India in 1767, eventually becoming a major in the Bengal Army. He was a Director of the East India Company intermittently between 1789 and 1812, and gained a considerable personal fortune. He purchased the manor of Chilton and the estate of Fernhill at Winkfield in Berkshire,

He was elected Member of Parliament for Abingdon in 1796 as a Tory. He  sat for the seat until his defeat at the 1807 general election. Most of his contributions in the Commons related to India and its administration. On 21 December 1802 he was created a baronet, of Chilton in the County of Berkshire in the Baronetage of the United Kingdom. He was High Sheriff of Berkshire in 1809.

Personal life
Metcalfe married Susannah Selina Sophia Debonnaire on 18 April 1782, and together they had eight children:
Sir Theophilus John Metcalfe, 2nd Baronet
Charles Metcalfe, 1st Baron Metcalfe (1785–1846)
Louisa Sophia Metcalfe (1787–?)
Selina Sophia Metcalfe (1788–1791)
Emily Theophila Metcalfe (1790–1885)
Georgiana Theophila Metcalfe
Sir Thomas Metcalfe, 4th Baronet (1795–1853)
Henry Theophilus Metcalfe

References

1745 births
1813 deaths
Baronets in the Baronetage of the United Kingdom
British East India Company Army officers
British people in colonial India
Directors of the British East India Company
High Sheriffs of Berkshire
Tory MPs (pre-1834)
Members of the Parliament of Great Britain for English constituencies
British MPs 1796–1800
Members of the Parliament of the United Kingdom for English constituencies
UK MPs 1801–1802
UK MPs 1802–1806
People from Winkfield